is a former Japanese football player.

Playing career
Kato was born in Kashima on September 19, 1980. He joined the J1 League club Kashima Antlers youth team in 1999. However, he did not play as often as Daijiro Takakuwa or Hitoshi Sogahata. He moved to JEF United Ichihara in July 2002 and then Yokohama F. Marinos in October on loan. However, he did not play much in either club. Although he returned to the Kashima Antlers in 2003, he did play at all and was released from the club at the end of the 2003 season. After a year, he joined Kashiwa Reysol. On November 23, he debuted against Sanfrecce Hiroshima. However he was not put into play as often as Yuta Minami. In June 2009, he moved to Ehime FC. He played often under manager Kazuhito Mochizuki. However Mochizuki was dismissed and Kato was not put into play under the new manager, Ivica Barbarić. In 2010, he moved to Ventforet Kofu, but was not put into play. In 2011, he moved to the Japan Football League club AC Nagano Parceiro. Although he played often, he retired at the end of the 2011 season.

Club statistics

References

External links

1980 births
Living people
Association football people from Ibaraki Prefecture
Japanese footballers
J1 League players
J2 League players
Japan Football League players
Kashima Antlers players
JEF United Chiba players
Yokohama F. Marinos players
Kashiwa Reysol players
Ehime FC players
Ventforet Kofu players
AC Nagano Parceiro players
Association football goalkeepers